The 1912 Wisconsin gubernatorial election was held on November 5, 1912.

Incumbent Republican Governor Francis E. McGovern defeated Democratic nominee John C. Karel and Socialist nominee Carl D. Thompson, with 45.55% of the vote.

Primary elections
Primary elections were held on September 3, 1912.

Democratic primary

Candidates
John C. Karel, Milwaukee County Court judge
Adolph J. Schmitz, lawyer, Democratic nominee for Lieutenant Governor in 1894, Democratic nominee for Governor in 1910

Results

Republican primary

Candidates
Francis E. McGovern, incumbent Governor

Results

Socialist primary

Candidates
Carl D. Thompson, former member of the Wisconsin State Assembly

Results

Prohibition primary

Candidates
Charles L. Hill, Prohibition nominee for Lieutenant Governor in 1910

Results

General election

Candidates
Major party candidates
Francis E. McGovern, Republican
John C. Karel, Democratic

Other candidates
Charles L. Hill, Prohibition
Carl D. Thompson, Socialist (Social-Democratic Party of Wisconsin)
William H. Curtis, Socialist Labor

Results

References

Bibliography
  
 
 

1912
Wisconsin
Gubernatorial
November 1912 events